Nogometni klub Dob, currently named Roltek Dob due to sponsorship reasons, is a Slovenian football club based in the town of Dob near Domžale. They competes in the Slovenian Second League. The club was founded in 1961.

Stadium
Dob plays at the Dob Sports Park, which is located in Dob. The stadium has a seating capacity for 300 spectators.

Dob Sports Park includes the main stadium and a training field with natural grass. There is also one smaller field for younger selections, covered with artificial turf. In 2014, the stadium was partially renovated, as it received another training field and the fence around the main field was replaced.

Honours
Slovenian Second League
Winners: 2013–14

MNZ Ljubljana Cup
Winners: 2009–10, 2015–16

League history since 1991

References

External links
Official website 
Soccerway profile

Association football clubs established in 1961
Football clubs in Slovenia
Football clubs in Yugoslavia
1961 establishments in Slovenia